The Berkeley Public Library is the public library system for Berkeley, California. It consists of the Central Library, Claremont Branch, North Branch, West Branch, Tarea Hill Pittman South Branch—and the Tool Lending Library, which is one of the nation's first such libraries.

History
Berkeley Public Library opened in 1893 on Shattuck Avenue with 264 books.  In 1905, the library moved to a new brick building on Shattuck Avenue at 2090 Kittredge Street. The new library was funded by Andrew Carnegie and  built on land donated by Rosa M. Shattuck, the widow of Francis K. Shattuck.  Immediately following the 1906 San Francisco earthquake and the resulting population surge from across the Bay, the library opened four other branches around Berkeley.  In 1930, the library was demolished and a new design from architect James W. Plachek was approved. Construction of the new building began in 1931. The new central library opened in 1934, where it remains. It was renovated and reopened in 2002.

In 2011, Berkeley Public Library began a series of renovations and expansions of its four neighborhood branches. It completed renovation of the Claremont and North Branches in 2012, and the South Branch and Tool Lending Library in May 2013. On December 14, 2013, the West Branch library reopened, revealing the $7.5 million project. During construction, a bookmobile called the Branch Van parked near each location to conduct basic transactions and provide access to library collections in the local neighborhoods.

On July 1, 2018, Berkeley Public Library eliminated overdue fines for teen and adult books, CDs, DVDs, and magazines returned past their due date (children's materials were already fine-free).

Also in 2018, Berkeley Public Library instituted the Easy Access Card, a library card available to persons without a fixed address. The Easy Access card offers access to the Library's electronic resources as well as limited checkouts of books and other materials.

Technology
All Berkeley Public Library branches have self-checkout machines. Patrons can use these to check out materials themselves by scanning the items and their library card. This checkout method works for all media—books, CDs, DVDs, etc.—and provides the patron with a receipt for the items. All branches still also offer checkout from library staff at circulation desks.

Patrons can also request and renew books over the Internet from their homes, or over the telephone.

Tool lending library
The Tool Lending Library opened in 1979, and is one of the nation's first such libraries. It is located at the South Branch. To borrow tools, patrons must be over the age of 18 and be residents or property owners of the city of Berkeley.

Tool Lending Library offerings include basic hand tools, light power tools, and equipment: screwdrivers, various hammers, drills, biscuit jointers, string trimmers ("weed wackers") shovels, ladders, concrete mixers—and free advice.  Late fees are $1, $5 or $10 per day, depending on the item. Lending times are seven days for manual items, and two days for power tools.

Gallery

References

External links

History of the Berkeley Public Library
 by William Porter, 27 data pages by Page & Turnbull, 1998

Library buildings completed in 1930
Education in Berkeley, California
Libraries in Alameda County, California
Public libraries in California
Libraries on the National Register of Historic Places in California
National Register of Historic Places in Berkeley, California
1930 in California
Link+ libraries
Art Deco architecture in California
Government of Berkeley, California
Historic American Buildings Survey in California